The 2022 Azadi March I was a protest march initiated by the ousted former Pakistani prime minister and Pakistan Tehreek-e-Insaf party chairman Imran Khan against the government of his successor, Prime Minister Shehbaz Sharif. On 24 May 2022, Khan announced a long march towards Islamabad starting on 25 May 2022. Khan lead the march from Peshawar, the capital of Khyber Pakhtunkhwa, where his provincial government helped him. Senior PTI members lead the march from Lahore, the capital of Punjab.

Imran Khan asked people to reach the Srinagar Highway in Islamabad to support his demands for early elections. His workers would stay in Islamabad as required, for their only demand would be to give a date for clean and transparent general elections and to dissolve assemblies. Addressing the bureaucracy and the police, Khan said it would be illegal for them to take any action against the "peaceful protest". Addressing the Pakistan Army, he said "if you are neutral then be neutral too". It was expected that the protest would involve around 2 million workers marching to Islamabad and that they would remain there until the election is declared. The protesters, led by Imran Khan, aimed to hold a sit-in at  D-Chowk in Islamabad until the date for the dissolution of assemblies and a date for new general elections was announced. Imran Khan gave a six-day ultimatum to the government to declare elections and dissolve assemblies.

Background 
In April 2022, Imran Khan was ousted as prime minister by a no-confidence motion, which he called a conspiracy of regime change initiated by the US government's Biden administration.

In his first interview with International media following his ouster, on CNN with Becky Anderson, he accused members of his party for "Jumping Ship" by being offered millions of dollars by US officials at the Embassy of the United States, Islamabad, thus weakening the Coalition Government in the National Assembly of Pakistan which mostly consisted of MNA's from Pakistan Tehreek-e-Insaf (Imran Khan's Party) and other independent candidates and allied parties. Consequently, this made the no-confidence motion successful though only by only 2 votes (174 combined votes of the then Opposition parties in the National Assembly of Pakistan in favor of the no-confidence motion).

After his ouster, Khan continued pressuring the government to hold snap elections.

March 
On 22 May, he called for his supporters to march to Islamabad on 25 May and said he would personally lead the Haqiqi Azadi ("complete freedom") march from Khyber Pakhtunkhwa to the Srinagar Highway.

In the days following 25th May 'Punjab Police (Pakistan)' governed by the then Chief Minister 'Hamza Shahbaz' (Son of Shehbaz Sharif) initiated a crackdown on members of PTI's party and other popular figures in the country who stood by Imran Khan.Justice Nasira Iqbal's (daughter-in-law of Allama Iqbal) house was raided by 8 Punjab policemen at 02:00 am in the morning. The police jumped over the walls to enter her house without a warrant to arrest her son Walid Iqbal (PTI Senator). She was quoted as saying that, "This happens where anarchists are in power".

On the 'Azadi March''' Day a senior member of Pakistan Tehreek-e-Insaf  'Dr. Yasmin Rashid' took to the streets in her car for a peaceful protest in the city of Lahore but on her way to the protest, she encountered a mob of policemen along with unidentified individuals shading their faces beneath cloth fragments. When 'Dr. Yasmin Rashid's ' tried to go past them her car was immediately surrounded and then severely damaged with sticks. Luckily, she was able to escape by rushing the car forward. The car seated 3 women and 'Dr. Yasmin Rashid' was the driver since her driver had been arrested. 'Dr. Yasmin Rashid' accused the Interior Minister 'Rana Sanaullah' but no action was ever taken by any court.

Hundreds of potential marchers were arrested in an alleged crackdown by the new Government of Pakistan. To prevent protestors from reaching the Srinagar Highway, Red Zone (Islamabad) and entering the capital, hundreds of containers were given to the Islamabad Police and a ban was placed on gatherings. The entrance towards the D-Chowk (Islamabad) was blocked by hundreds of personnel from the Capital Territory Police not allowing protestors to come close by launching tear gas shells at the protestors which included women, children, and families.

After dawn on 26th May,'' Imran Khan called off the March on Blue Area just 2.10 miles away from where the Police stood firing tear gas shells. In a later interview he said that the reason he called off the March was to avoid bloodshed since the people were ready to fight against the police.

See also 
 2014 Azadi march
 2019 Azadi march
 2022 Azadi March II

References 

2022 in Pakistani politics
2022 protests
Imran Khan
May 2022 events in Pakistan
Pakistan Tehreek-e-Insaf
Protest marches
Protests in Pakistan